The Haberstein is a blockfield of granite rocks complete with a large rock tower. It is located on the western slopes of the Schneeberg, the highest mountain in the Fichtelgebirge range in Germany. From the Haberstein there is a good view of the neighbouring mountain of the Ochsenkopf and its recently built ski jump. The nearby village of Bischofsgrün is also easy to pick out. The Haberstein can be easily reached on foot over a network of walking trails.

Fichtel Mountains
Mountains under 1000 metres